Ulsan Hyundai Mipo Dockyard Dolphin was a South Korean football club based in the city of Ulsan. They competed in the National League between 2003 and 2016. They were owned and operated by Hyundai Mipo Dockyard and played their home games at Ulsan Stadium.

History 
The club was founded in 1998 as works team of Hyundai Mipo Dockyard, global shipbuilding company, and joined the Korea National League in 2003. They have won the National League seven times (2007, 2008, 2011, 2013, 2014, 2015 and 2016). In 2016, Hyundai Mipo Dockyard announced that they will not fund the team anymore, and the club was dissolved after the 2016 season.

Honours

Domestic competitions

League
 National League
Winners (7): 2007, 2008, 2011, 2013, 2014, 2015, 2016

Cups
 FA Cup
Runners-up (1): 2005
 National League Championship
Winners (3): 2004, 2011, 2016
Runners-up (4): 2006, 2010, 2012, 2015
 National Sports Festival
Gold Medal (1): 2003
 National Football Championship
Winners (1): 2000
 President's Cup
Winners (2): 2005, 2008

Statistics

See also 
 Ulsan Hyundai FC
 List of football clubs in South Korea

References

External links 
  

Hyundai Heavy Industries Group
Sport in Ulsan
Korea National League clubs
Association football clubs established in 1998
Association football clubs disestablished in 2016
1998 establishments in South Korea
2016 disestablishments in South Korea
Defunct football clubs in South Korea
Works association football clubs in South Korea